(nicknamed Drac) is a trans-Neptunian object and the first one with a retrograde orbit to be discovered. This retrograde motion with an orbital inclination of 103° suggests that it is the missing link between its source in the Hills cloud and Halley-type comets, thus providing further insight into the evolution of the outer Solar System. With a semi-major axis of 42 AU, it takes about 269 years to complete an orbit around the Sun.

Officially discovered on 31 May 2008, the discovery was announced on 16 July 2008, by the Canada–France Ecliptic Plane Survey team led by Brett Gladman. The discovery team nicknamed  "Drac" after Count Dracula.

Discovery and naming 
The announcement was made during the "Asteroids, Comets, Meteors" meeting held in Baltimore, Maryland, followed by a Minor Planet Electronic Circular on the same day and an IAU Circular on 18 July. The discovery was made using images obtained on 31 May from the 3.5-meter Canada-France-Hawaii Telescope, followed by further observations until 8 July from the Whipple Observatory and Cerro Tololo.

The discovery team nicknamed  Drac because of its high inclination in reference to its orbital plane resembling Count Dracula's ability to walk on walls.

Orbit 

 is the first trans-Neptunian object (TNO) with a retrograde orbit to be discovered. With a semi-major axis of 41.7 AU, it was discovered while at a distance of 32 AU and has a perihelion at roughly the distance of Uranus.

The object's 103° inclination makes its almost perpendicular to the ecliptic, and is, as of July 2017, one of only six objects known to have inclination and perihelion larger than 60° and 15 AU, respectively.

Its unusual orbit suggests that  may have been perturbed inwards from its source, most likely in the Hills cloud, by an unknown gravitational disturbance. Its discovery may reveal the source regions for Halley-type comets which also have an retrograde orbit, but their origin remains unknown.  itself is believed to be in an intermediate stage towards becoming a comet, thus helping to further explain the formation and evolution of the outer Solar System.

Planet Nine 
 may even provide evidence of Planet Nine. The Kozai effect inside the mean-motion resonances with Planet Nine may cause a periodic exchange between its inclination and its eccentricity.

See also 
 List of trans-Neptunian objects
 (471325) 2011 KT19 ("Niku")

References

External links 
 
 

528219
528219
528219
528219
20080531
Minor planets with a retrograde orbit